Mustafa Üstündağ (1933–1983) was a Turkish school teacher, politician and former government minister.

Early life
Mustafa Üstündağ was born in Ortakaraören village of Seydişehir ilçe (district) in Konya Province. After graduating from İvriz Village Institute in 1951, he served in various schools as a teacher. In 1960, he graduated from Gazi Institute for Education in Ankara. He obtained a Master's degree from the University of Wisconsin. He joined the academic staff of Hacettepe University.

Political life
Mustafa Üstündağ joined the Republican People's Party (CHP) and in 1969 Turkish general elections he was elected a deputy from Konya Province. In the 1973 and 1977, he was reelected. Beginning 1970, he represented CHP in the European Council.  In 1971 he was  elected as the general secretary of CHP. Both in the 37th and the 40th government of Turkey, he served as the Minister of National Education. During his term as minister, he launched the system of Distance education. He tried to establish the equality in education.

Later years
His political life ended on 12 September 1980 by the 1980 Turkish coup d'état. On 30 June 1983 he died in a car accident. He was laid to rest in Konya.

References

1933 births
People from Seydişehir
Gazi Eğitim Enstitüsü alumni
University of Wisconsin–Madison alumni
Turkish schoolteachers
Republican People's Party (Turkey) politicians
Deputies of Konya
Members of the 14th Parliament of Turkey
Members of the 15th Parliament of Turkey
Members of the 16th Parliament of Turkey
Members of the 37th government of Turkey
Members of the 40th government of Turkey
Ministers of National Education of Turkey
Road incident deaths in Turkey
1983 deaths
Academic staff of Hacettepe University